Pegasus Road is an  long road of dirt and packed snow constructed by the United States Antarctic Program on Ross Island and the Ross Ice Shelf in Antarctica. The trip along the road from McMurdo Station to Pegasus Field takes approximately 45 minutes in a "Delta" wheeled vehicle, although on occasion high temperatures have damaged the runway and caused the road surface to deteriorate enough to lengthen the trip to two hours.

New Zealand's Scott Base is also served by the road.

References

Abstract
 (includes maps)

External links

Road infrastructure in Antarctica
Ice roads